World of Giants (a.k.a. W-O-G) is an American black-and-white science fiction spy-fi television series that aired in syndication from September 5, 1959 until November 28, 1959. It starred Marshall Thompson and Arthur Franz.

Premise
American spy Mel Hunter, while on a covert mission, is shrunk to a height of six inches after an accident. This series stars Marshall Thompson as Federal Counter-Espionage Agent Mel Hunter, who uses his small size to infiltrate areas that a full-sized man could not. When not on assignment, he lives in a specially outfitted dollhouse-like miniature. The series co-stars Arthur Franz as his full-sized partner, Agent Bill Winters.

Thompson set up the premise in the show's opening voiceover:

Cast
Marshall Thompson as Mel Hunter
Arthur Franz as Bill Winters
John Gallaudet as Commissioner Hogg
Marcia Henderson as Miss Brown

Episodes

Production
World of Giants was produced by Ziv Television Programs, the company responsible for such hit TV series as Highway Patrol, Sea Hunt, and Bat Masterson.

Not a success, this series only lasted through its initial production order of 13 episodes. Thompson later went on to star in the (much more) successful CBS TV series Daktari (1966-1969).

In popular culture
Nearly a decade later, in 1968, a similarly-themed  Irwin Allen science fiction TV series, entitled Land of the Giants, starring Gary Conway and Don Marshall, ran on ABC. Two years prior to that series, an animated kids TV show called Tom of T.H.U.M.B., aired as a part of The King Kong Show. In 1973 the Hanna-Barbera's animated series Inch High, Private Eye, about a similarly small detective, premiered on NBC, airing for only one season.

References

External links

1959 American television series debuts
1959 American television series endings
English-language television shows
First-run syndicated television programs in the United States
Television series by Ziv Television Programs
Television series by MGM Television
Television series about size change
Television shows set in England